Protein deltex-1 is a protein that in humans is encoded by the DTX1 gene.

Function 

Studies in Drosophila have identified this gene as encoding a positive regulator of the notch signaling pathway. The human gene encodes a protein of unknown function; however, it may play a role in basic helix-loop-helix transcription factor activity.

Interactions 

DTX1 has been shown to interact with EP300.

References

Further reading